Keri-Michele Cox (born 9 October 1968) is an association football player who represented New Zealand.

Cox made her Football Ferns 15–0 win over Samoa on 3 December 1987, and finished her international career with 20 caps and 9 goals to her credit.

Cox's mother Barbara Cox and sister Tara Cox also represented New Zealand.

References   

1968 births
Living people
New Zealand women's international footballers
New Zealand women's association footballers
Women's association football midfielders